Aichhorn is a German surname. Notable people with the surname include:

 August Aichhorn (1878–1949), Austrian educator and psychoanalyst
 Silke Aichhorn, German harpist

See also
 Eichhorn

German-language surnames